is the fifth single by Japanese girl group Nogizaka46. It was number one on the Oricon weekly singles chart. It reached number three on the Billboard Japan Hot 100. On December 31, 2015, Nogizaka46 appeared on the 66th NHK Kōhaku Uta Gassen for the first time and sang this song.

Release 
This single was released in 4 versions. Type-A, Type-B, Type-C and a regular edition. The center position in the choreography for the title song is held by Rina Ikoma.

Track listing

Type-A

Type-B

Type-C

Regular Edition

Use as station departure melody
"Kimi no Na wa Kibō" is to be used as the departure melody on the platforms of Nogizaka Station on the Tokyo Metro Chiyoda Line from spring 2016.

Chart and certifications

Weekly charts

Year-end charts

Certifications

References

Further reading

External links
 Discography on Nogizaka46 Official Website 
 

2013 singles
Japanese-language songs
Nogizaka46 songs
Oricon Weekly number-one singles
Songs with lyrics by Yasushi Akimoto
Songs written by Katsuhiko Sugiyama